Nancy Allen (born June 24, 1950) is an American actress. She came to prominence for her performances in several films directed by Brian De Palma in the 1970s and early 1980s. Her accolades include a Golden Globe Award nomination and three Saturn Award nominations.

The daughter of a New York City police lieutenant, Allen was raised in the Bronx, and attended the High School of Performing Arts, aspiring to have a career as a dancer. In her early twenties, she shifted her focus to acting and relocated to Los Angeles to pursue a career there. Her first major role was as Chris Hargensen in Brian De Palma's film adaptation of Carrie (1976). Allen was subsequently cast as the lead in the Robert Zemeckis-directed comedy I Wanna Hold Your Hand (1978), followed by a supporting part in Steven Spielberg's 1941 (1979).

Allen married De Palma in 1979, and her subsequent portrayal of a prostitute who witnesses a murder in his feature Dressed to Kill (1980) earned her a Golden Globe nomination for New Star of the Year. She then appeared in De Palma's neo-noir film Blow Out (1981), playing a woman implicated in an assassination. Allen and DePalma divorced in 1984.

She appeared in the science fiction films Strange Invaders (1983) and The Philadelphia Experiment (1984), and Abel Ferrara's television film The Gladiator (1986). Allen garnered mainstream fame playing Anne Lewis in Paul Verhoeven's RoboCop (1987), a role she reprised for the two sequels that followed. Other credits include Poltergeist III (1988), Limit Up (1990), and Les patriotes (1994).

Allen stepped back from acting in 2008, and became involved in cancer support after her friend, Wendie Jo Sperber, died of breast cancer. In 2010, she was named executive director of the weSPARK Cancer Support Center in Los Angeles, which was founded by Sperber.

Life and career

1950–1972: Early life 
Allen was born on June 24, 1950 in the Bronx borough of New York City, the youngest of three children of Eugene and Florence Allen. Her father was a police lieutenant. Allen was raised on 196th Street in the Pelham Bay section of the Bronx. 

Allen was a very shy child, so her mother enrolled her in dance classes when she was four. She attended the Academy of Mount St. Ursula in the Bronx, before the family relocated to Yonkers. Interested in modern dance, she attended the High School of Performing Arts for one year, where she trained for a dancing career. She stated that her experience studying dance "ruined it" for her as it "became all about grades...  I discovered that, while I loved to dance, it wasn't my life." She subsequently enrolled at Jose Quintano's School for Young Professionals.

1973–1986: Career beginnings

Allen's first major film role was as Nancy, Jack Nicholson's nervous date, in The Last Detail (1973), directed by Hal Ashby. This inspired her to move to Los Angeles to continue her acting career. Initially, Allen struggled to find acting jobs and was told by an agent that, being 25 years old, it "was over for her." However, in November 1975, she auditioned for the role of the spoiled and popular mean girl Christine Hargensen in director Brian De Palma's horror film Carrie (1976) opposite Sissy Spacek, Amy Irving, and John Travolta, as the title character's chief nemesis. After a protracted casting process (in which Allen was nearly re-cast at the instruction of the producers), she was officially given the role.

Allen next appeared in the role of Pam Mitchell in Steven Spielberg's production of I Wanna Hold Your Hand (1978), which was director Robert Zemeckis's first feature film. She then played Donna Stratton in the Spielberg-directed comedy 1941 (1979) opposite Tim Matheson, John Belushi, Dan Aykroyd, and John Candy.

She married director Brian De Palma on January 12, 1979, and over the next several years appeared in three of his films: She starred as Kristina in Home Movies (1980) with Kirk Douglas, followed by her portrayal of prostitute Liz Blake in the thriller Dressed to Kill (1980). For her performance, she was nominated for a Golden Globe for New Star of the Year. She next starred in her last collaboration with De Palma, the neo-noir Blow Out (1981), playing a woman involved in an assassination that is audibly captured by a sound engineer. In filming Blow Out, she had to overcome a lifelong fear of being trapped in a submerged car filling with water. 

In 1983, Allen starred as supermarket tabloid reporter Betty Walker in Strange Invaders, written by Bill Condon and co-starring Paul LeMat and Michael Lerner.

She and De Palma divorced in 1984. That same year, two of Allen's films were released, The Buddy System opposite Richard Dreyfuss and Susan Sarandon and The Philadelphia Experiment opposite Michael Paré. For her role in the latter, Allen was nominated for a Saturn Award for Best Actress. Allen began dating Paré after the production. She also hosted the documentary Terror in the Aisles (1984), which presents clips from various horror features, including Dressed to Kill and Carrie. Paul Bartel's Not for Publication and Sweet Revenge, an action caper about white slavery with Gina Gershon and Martin Landau, followed thereafter.

1987–1993: RoboCop and other projects 
Allen played police officer Anne Lewis in the science fiction/action classic RoboCop (1987) opposite Peter Weller in the title role. The film, which was the Hollywood debut of Dutch director Paul Verhoeven, did extremely well at the box office. Allen was nominated for another Saturn Award for Best Actress.

After the success of RoboCop, Allen starred in Abel Ferrara's The Gladiator (1987) and as Patricia Wilson-Gardner in Poltergeist III (1988) opposite Tom Skerritt, Lara Flynn Boyle, and Heather O'Rourke, who died before production was completed. Allen reprised her role as Officer Lewis in RoboCop 2 (1990) alongside Weller. To make her character tougher and more involved in the physical action, she studied martial arts and participated in police training. She recalled the filming of RoboCop 2 as unpleasant, however, and later referred to director Irvin Kershner as a "miserable human being." That same year, Allen top-lined Richard Martini's Limit Up. As commodities trader Casey Falls, Allen showcased her comedic abilities. The lighthearted romp also featured Danitra Vance and blues icon Ray Charles. In 1990, Allen also had the distinction of starring in the first-ever original film made for the Lifetime television network, the highly-rated Memories of Murder.

She married comedian Craig Shoemaker on September 6, 1992. Allen played Officer Lewis a third time in RoboCop 3 (1993) and was nominated for a Saturn Award for Best Supporting Actress. For her third performance as the feisty cop, she worked to soften the usually tough-as-nails demeanor of the character: "You do your job and you become more confident with yourself. Therefore, you don't have to prove yourself to anyone and basically deny your womanhood. (It's) not a dirty word. It's actually an asset. And that's what I wanted to show – to loosen her up in that way." The same year, Allen also appeared with Linda Fiorentino in Acting on Impulse. She and Shoemaker eventually divorced in 1994.

1994–present: Later career; activism
Allen has appeared in a number of documentaries about her most famous films, including Dressed to Kill, Carrie, Blow Out, the RoboCop trilogy, and Poltergeist III.

In 1994, she re-teamed with Strange Invaders writer Bill Condon to star as psychic Jessie Gallardo opposite Roger Moore in the movie of the week The Man Who Wouldn't Die. She also had a supporting part in the French drama film Les patriotes (1994). In 1995, she starred in a Broadway production of the play Dial M For Murder by Frederick Knott, which had been the basis for Alfred Hitchcock's film of the same name. It starred John James as Tony Wendice, Nancy Allen as Margot and Roddy McDowall as Inspector Hubbard. It was run from September 26, 1995, to March 10, 1996, and directed by Edward Hastings. She starred as Linda Savage in Quality Time in 1997, but the film was not released until 2008 due, in part, to post-production and renamed My Apocalypse. She and builder/contractor Randy Bailey were married in June 1998.

Allen had a small but notable role as Midge in the crime thriller Out of Sight (1998) starring George Clooney and Jennifer Lopez, which was directed by Steven Soderbergh. She also played Rachel Colby in the horror film Children of the Corn 666: Isaac's Return and Madge in the comedy-thriller Kiss Toledo Goodbye with Christopher Walken (both released in 1999). Secret of the Andes, an adventure film starring David Keith and Jerry Stiller, was released in 2000.

Her television guest appearances include roles on Touched by an Angel, The Outer Limits, The Commish, and Law & Order: Special Victims Unit.

Allen and Bailey separated in 2005 and divorced in 2007. In 2008, she  decided to shift her focus to cancer support for cancer patients and their families. She was inspired to focus her time on the subject after her friend and former co-star Wendie Jo Sperber died of breast cancer in 2005. In December 2010, Allen was named executive director of the weSPARK Cancer Support Center, which was founded by Sperber prior to her death. Of her work at weSpark, Allen said: "That is what I do. That is what my life is dedicated to. I'm there, I run it. I've created the whole program format and I fundraise. It is my life's work."

Filmography

Accolades

References

Sources

External links 

 
 
 

1950 births
Living people
American television actresses
Actresses from Los Angeles
Actresses from New York City
20th-century American actresses
21st-century American actresses
American film actresses
American child models
Female models from New York (state)
Lee Strasberg Theatre and Film Institute alumni
Entertainers from the Bronx
Activists from California
Activists from New York City